Brian Cina is an American politician who serves in the Vermont House of Representatives from the Chittenden-6-4 district as a member of the Vermont Progressive Party. Prior to his tenure in the state house he was active in local politics in Burlington, Vermont.

Early life and education

Brian Cina was born in New Jersey. He was valedictorian of his graduating class at Lodi High School in 1994 He graduated from Dartmouth College, which he had moved to attend in New Hampshire in 1994, with a Bachelor of Arts in music. He moved to Burlington, Vermont, in 1998, and worked for the AmeriCorps. He attended the University of Vermont from 2003 to 2005, and graduated from the university with a master of social work degree.

Career

Local politics

Cina was elected to the school board from the 2nd district in Burlington in the 2014 election. He won reelection to the school board from the Central district in the 2015 election. He did not seek reelection in 2017. During his tenure on the school board he led a committee to find an interim superintendent.

Cina supported Max Tracy during the 2021 Burlington mayoral election.

Vermont House of Representatives

Representatives Chris Pearson, a member of the Progressive Party, and Kesha Ram, a member of the Democratic Party, declined to run for reelection to the Vermont House of Representatives in 2016. Cina ran for a seat in the state house from the Chittenden-6-4 district in the 2018 election with the nominations of the Democratic and Progressive parties and won in the general election alongside Selene Colburn.  He and Colburn were reelection in the 2018 and 2020 elections.

Political positions

Cina and Representatives Diana Gonzalez and Colburn wrote an open letter calling for at least twenty percent of Vermont's police budget to be diverted to other services. The state house voted eighty-nine to fifty-eight, with Cina in favor, in favor of raising the minimum wage and creating a paid family leave program.

Electoral history

References

Dartmouth College alumni
21st-century American politicians
Democratic Party members of the Vermont House of Representatives
Living people
Vermont Progressive Party politicians
Year of birth missing (living people)
LGBT state legislators in Vermont